The federal government of the Republic of Austria recognised Albania as a sovereign and independent state on February 18, 1922. A passport office had been opened in Vienna on April of the previous year by Gjergj Pekmezi who was to become the first consul representative of Albania to Austria.

After the war, the two countries re-established diplomatic ties on December 20, 1955. They exchanged representatives the following year, with Walter Wodak presenting his credentials on behalf of the Austrian government on June 13, 1956, followed by Koço Prifti who presented his credentials for the Albanian side on October 10.

List of diplomatic representatives of Albania to Austria (1922–present)

References 

 
Austria
Albania